is Japanese for "Snow Wind", or, idiomatically, snowstorm or blizzard.

Yukikaze may also refer to:

 Japanese destroyer Yukikaze, a Japanese destroyer that served during World War II
 Yukikaze, an Isokaze-class assault destroyer in the Japanese anime television series Space Battleship Yamato
 Yukikaze (anime) (Sentō Yōsei Yukikaze), a Japanese science fiction anime OVA series based on a novel by Chōhei Kanbayashi
 The best friend and first assistant to Ayanami, one of the major antagonists in the Japanese manga and anime 07-Ghost